The Woodbridge School District is a public school district in northwestern Sussex County and southwestern Kent County, Delaware in the United States. The district's administrative offices are in an unincorporated area with a Bridgeville postal address.

Geography
The Woodbridge School District serves the northwestern portion Sussex County and the extreme southwestern portion of Kent County in the state of Delaware. Communities served by the district include the majority of Bridgeville and all of Greenwood in Sussex County and all of Farmington in Kent County.

School board
P. Michael Breeding, President 	
Walter Rudy, Vice President
Walter P.J. Gilfeski
John Barr
Steve McCarron
Heath Chasanov, Executive Secretary

Schools
Woodbridge High School
Woodbridge Middle School
Phillis Wheatley Elementary School
Woodbridge Early Childhood Education Center

Facilities
The headquarters were previously in Greenwood.

See also
List of school districts in Delaware

References

School districts in Kent County, Delaware
School districts in Sussex County, Delaware